Gaylin La Roy Den Ouden (born October 9, 1945) is an American politician in the state of Minnesota. He served in the Minnesota House of Representatives.

References

1945 births
Living people
People from Pipestone County, Minnesota
Republican Party members of the Minnesota House of Representatives
Dordt University alumni
Southwest Minnesota State University alumni